Choshuenco is a village on the eastern edge of Panguipulli Lake in Panguipulli commune, Los Lagos Region, Chile.

Choshuenco is served by Molco Airport.

Populated places in Valdivia Province
Populated lakeshore places in Chile